Five ships of the Hellenic Navy have borne the name Psara (Ψαρά), named after the island of Psara, which played a major role in the Greek War of Independence:

 Psara (1830–1833), a sail corvette, renamed to Prinkips Maximilianos in 1833
  (1880–1889), a former British freighter, used as a torpedo boat tender, renamed to Kanaris
  (1890–1932), a French-built ironclad warship
  (1933–1941), Dardo-class destroyer
  (1998–present), a Hydra-class (MEKO 200 type) frigate

Hellenic Navy ship names